The Ascension Island Council is an elected body that provides advice to the Administrator of Ascension Island on matters relating to the governance of Ascension Island. The Council is made up of either five or seven Councillors, depending on the number of candidates standing for an election, and its meetings are chaired by the Administrator. The Island's constitution requires the Governor and Administrator to consult with the Council when making laws for Ascension Island. The Governor and Administrator are not bound to accept the advice of the Council but the Council has the right of appeal to the British Government.

Electoral system
The five (or seven) seats in the Ascension Island Council are elected for three years terms by first-past-the-post Plurality-at-large voting, with voters allowed to cast up to five (or seven) votes respectively. If there is eight or more candidates, the election will be of seven members; if there are six or seven nominations, the election will return a Council of five members. If there are fewer than six nominations, the election will be postponed for a period of up to six months, during which time there will be no Island Council.

Council members
The current council consists of five elected members known as Councillors, who were elected in September 2019.

Members of the Ascension Island Council:

Following a further By-Election on 4 March 2021, Councillors Nicholas Ivan John and Douglas Gordon Miller joined the Island Council.

Qualifications of Councillors
Candidates must be 21 years of age, have British Citizenship, British Overseas Territory Citizenship or British Overseas Citizenship, must reside on the island and should have been resident on the island for the 12 months preceding nomination. In practice candidates will typically have been on the island for several years. They must also be on the electoral register for the island.

History and elections

First Council
The first Ascension Island Council of seven members was elected and took office on 1 November 2002.

Second Council
This first Council was dissolved by order of the Governor of Saint Helena on 24 October 2005, and a new election was held on 16 November 2005, a total of 697 electors choosing between 10 candidates contesting the seven seats. Six of the seven members resigned in January 2007 in the belief that they were "assisting to legitimise a democracy that doesn’t really exist on Ascension Island". Consequently, a general election was called, but by the close of nominations there were only two candidates. As a result of the boycott, the election was abandoned, and the governor suspended the Island Council for 12 months.

Third Council
Elections to the third Council were to have taken place in April 2008 but following consultations they were delayed until October 2008. With eight nominations the elections were duly held and seven candidates were elected to form a new Island Council, which was sworn in on 28 October.

Fourth Council
The third Council was dissolved by the Governor in October 2010 with elections planned for 3 November 2010. By close of nominations on 19 October 2010, six nominations had been received (sufficient for elections to be held for a Council of five elected members), but two of the nominations were submitted late and therefore declared invalid. The Governor was therefore obliged to suspend the Island Government Ordinance and re-schedule the elections. On 3 February 2011, it was announced that an election would be held on 25 February. On 28 February 2011, the five new council members were sworn in by the Administrator.

Fifth Council
General elections were held on 31 October 2013.

Sixth Council
The general election was held on 1 September 2016 with six candidates running for the five seats of the Island Council.

Seventh Council 
On 26 September 2019 a general election of the Island Council was held. This followed the dissolution of the previous Council on 1 September 2019, in accordance with the Island Government (Ascension) Ordinance 2008.

Seven candidates ran for five available Councillor positions, with electors being permitted to cast up to five votes each. Of 518 registered electors 150 electors cast 498 votes, casting their ballots as follows:

The Council met formally for the first time at 12:15 on 27 September where Councillors were formally sworn in.

Seventh Council By-Election 
On 4 March 2021 a By-Election of the Island Council was held following the departure of two Councillors earlier in 2020.

Three candidates ran for two available Councillor positions, with electors being permitted to cast up to two votes each. Of 550 registered electors 108 electors cast 181 votes, casting their ballots as follows:

The Council met formally for the first time at 16:30 on 11 March 2021 where Councillors were formally sworn in.

See also
Legislative Council of Saint Helena
Tristan da Cunha Island Council

References

External links
Ascension Island Government

Legislatures of British Overseas Territories
Politics of Saint Helena

Ascension Island
Saint Helena, Ascension and Tristan da Cunha law